Joseph Charles White (1899–1967) was a Massachusetts state senator, state representative, Boston City Council president and chairman of the Boston School Committee. He was the father of Kevin Hagan White who was a mayor of Boston.

White was in the Massachusetts House of Representatives from 1929–1932. He was in the State Senate from 1933–1936.  White was a Roman Catholic and a member of the Knights of Columbus.

See also
 Massachusetts legislature: 1929–1930, 1931–1932, 1933–1934, 1935–1936

Sources
Congressional statement honoring the life of Kevin White
notes to Oral History interview of James W. Hennigan, Jr
Political Graveyard listing for White

1899 births
1967 deaths
Massachusetts state senators
Boston City Council members
American Roman Catholics
20th-century American politicians